The 2007 FA Community Shield (also known as The FA Community Shield sponsored by McDonald's for sponsorship reasons) was the 85th staging of the FA Community Shield, an annual football match played between the reigning Premier League champions and FA Cup winners. The match was played on 5 August 2007 between 2006–07 FA Premier League champions Manchester United and 2006–07 FA Cup winners Chelsea. Manchester United won the game 3–0 on penalties, after the match finished 1–1. Ryan Giggs opened the scoring in the 35th minute, before Florent Malouda equalised just before half-time.

The match then went to penalties, in which Chelsea went first. Edwin van der Sar saved Chelsea's first three penalties, leaving Wayne Rooney with the chance to win the match for United.

It was the first Community Shield match to be played at the new Wembley Stadium. Manchester United and Chelsea also contested the last Community Shield (then the Charity Shield) to be played at the old Wembley in 2000, with Chelsea winning the match 2–0.

Match details

Match statistics
First halfSecond halfOverall

Source:

References

External links

Community Shield 2007 at TheFA.com

2007
Fa Community Shield
Fa Community Shield
Fa Community Shield
Charity Shield 2007
Charity Shield 2007
Fa Community Shield 2007
Events at Wembley Stadium